Christof Teuscher is an author and editor who works at the Los Alamos National Laboratory, United States.

Teuscher obtained MSc and PhD degrees from the Swiss Federal Institute of Technology in Lausanne, Switzerland. For his PhD, he explored Alan Turing's ideas on artificial intelligence and neural networks.

He was the initiator and organizer of the Turing Day, an international workshop to commemorate the anniversary of Alan Turing's 90th birthday.

Dr Teuscher's work has been distinguished with several awards.

Bibliography
Alan Turing: Life and Legacy of a Great Thinker (ed.), Springer, (2005), 
 Turing's Connectionism. An Investigation of Neural Network Architectures, Springer, London, (2002), 
 From Utopian to Genuine Unconventional Computers (ed. with Andrew Adamatzky), 2006 
 Unconventional Computing 2007 (ed. with Andrew Adamatzky, Lawrence Bull, Ben De Lacy Costello, Susan Stepney), 2007

References

External links
 Christof Teuscher website

Year of birth missing (living people)
Living people
École Polytechnique Fédérale de Lausanne alumni
American computer scientists
American biographers
Computer systems researchers